Baytown Airport  is a public-use airport located  north of the central business district of Baytown, a city in Harris County, Texas, United States. It is privately owned by Raceco Inc.

Facilities and aircraft 
For the 12-month period ending October 2009, the airport had 9,490 general aviation aircraft operations, an average of 27 per day. At that time there were 27 aircraft based at the airport, including one jet and two helicopters.

In 2009 Herman Life Flight opened their new East Base on the airport property with one helicopter and crew accommodations.

References

External links 
  at Texas DOT airport directory
  at City of Baytown web site
 
 

Airports in Harris County, Texas
Galveston Bay Area
Baytown, Texas